Ketchum may refer to:

Towns, cities, and, geographic features
 Ketchum, Idaho, United States
 Ketchum, Oklahoma, United States
 Lake Ketchum, Washington, United States
 Ketchum Glacier, a glacier in Antarctica
 Ketchum Ridge, a large ridge in Antarctica

Other uses
 Ketchum (surname), a surname
 Ketchum Inc., a large public relations agency within Omnicom Group
 Ketchum Graham, Canadian politician
 Ketchum Street, a street in Grand Theft Auto IV and Grand Theft Auto: Episodes from Liberty City
 Ketchum Award, presented by Woods Hole Oceanographic Institution

See also
 Ketcham